Apamea genialis is a moth of the  family Noctuidae. It is found in North America.

Apamea (moth)
Moths of North America
Moths described in 1874
Taxa named by Augustus Radcliffe Grote